The 1978 Tour de France was the 65th edition of the Tour de France, one of cycling's Grand Tours. The Tour began in Leiden, the Netherlands, with a prologue individual time trial on 29 June, and Stage 12a occurred on 12 July with a flat stage from Tarbes. The race finished in Paris on 23 July.

Stage 12a
12 July 1978 – Tarbes to Valence d'Agen, 

The stage was neutralised after a protest, by the peloton, about split stages. The peloton rode slowly throughout the stage, and came to a stop  before the finish line. The riders then dismounted their bikes, crossing the finish line on foot, and the stage was cancelled by the race commissaires.

Stage 12b
12 July 1978 – Valence d'Agen to Toulouse,

Stage 13
13 July 1978 – Figeac to Super Besse,

Stage 14
14 July 1978 – Besse-en-Chandesse to Puy de Dôme,  (ITT)

Stage 15
15 July 1978 – Saint-Dier-d'Auvergne to Saint-Étienne,

Stage 16
16 July 1978 – Saint-Étienne to Alpe d'Huez,

Rest day 2
17 July 1978 – Alpe d'Huez

Stage 17
18 July 1978 – Grenoble to Morzine,

Stage 18
19 July 1978 – Morzine to Lausanne,

Stage 19
20 July 1978 – Lausanne to Belfort,

Stage 20
21 July 1978 – Metz to Nancy,  (ITT)

Stage 21
22 July 1978 – Épernay to Senlis,

Stage 22
23 July 1978 – Saint Germain en Laye to Paris Champs-Élysées,

References

1978 Tour de France
Tour de France stages